"I'm Already Taken" is the debut single by American country music artist Steve Wariner, released in April 1978. It peaked at number 63 on the U.S. Billboard country singles chart. In 1999, Wariner re-recorded the song for his album Two Teardrops. He released this re-recording in July as that album's second single, taking to number 3 on the same chart, as well as number 42 on the Billboard Hot 100.

Wariner co-wrote the song when he was 23 years old. The rendition from Two Teardrops includes a backing vocal from his brother, Terry, who has also sung backing vocals in Wariner's road band. Conway Twitty recorded the song on his 1981 album Mr. T.

Chart positions

Year-end charts

References

1978 debut singles
1978 singles
1999 singles
1978 songs
Steve Wariner songs
Conway Twitty songs
Songs written by Steve Wariner
RCA Records Nashville singles
Capitol Records Nashville singles
Song recordings produced by Chet Atkins